Matilda of Anjou, also known as Mahaut ( – 1154) was married in 1119 to William Adelin, son and heir apparent of Henry I of England.

Life
Matilda was the daughter of Count Fulk V of Anjou, and his first wife Ermengarde, Countess of Maine.<ref>Detlev Schwennicke, Europäische Stammtafeln: Stammtafeln zur Geschichte der Europäischen Staaten, Neue Folge, Band II (Marburg, Germany:  J. A. Stargardt, 1984), Tafel 82</ref> In February 1113, Fulk V and Henry I met near Alençon where they entered into a treaty of peace which was secured by the betrothal of Henry's son William Adelin and Fulk's daughter Matilda. The young couple were married in June 1119.

On the evening of 25 November 1120, returning from Normandy to England, William chose to sail aboard the White Ship'' and subsequently drowned when that ship sank in the English Channel just outside Barfleur harbour. Matilda had avoided the disaster, as passage for her had been arranged aboard another ship, presumably the one that her father-in-law was traveling on. His death left her a widow with no immediate heir to the throne of England and thus ended the treaty with Anjou.

On his return from Jerusalem, Fulk V demanded the return of Matilda's dowry, comprising castles and towns in Maine, to which Henry flatly refused. After months of fruitless quarreling Fulk was considering warring with Henry once more. Finally, Fulk countered Henry by marrying his other daughter, Sibylla, to William Clito, the son of Robert Curthose, Henry's nephew and rival for Normandy. Fulk dowered the couple with the lordship of Maine.

Meanwhile, after her husband's death Matilda remained at Henry's court and was treated as one of the king's daughters. Henry maintained she could remain as long as she wished and intended to marry her to one of his great nobles, "heaping on her wealth and honours which would have raised her above all her family." She remained in England for several years, unmarried, but according to Orderic, wishing to see her parents and home, she returned to Anjou. After a time in Anjou she took the advice of Geoffrey, Bishop of Chartres and in 1128 she took her vows at Fontevrault Abbey as a nun. In 1150 she became the abbess and died in 1154.

Notes

References

|-

|-

Duchesses of Normandy
Anglo-Norman Roman Catholic abbesses
Burials at Fontevraud Abbey
Abbesses of Fontevraud
1100s births
1154 deaths
12th-century English people
12th-century English women
12th-century French nuns
12th-century Norman women
Daughters of kings